I Can't Stand the Rain is an album by Ann Peebles. It was released on the Hi label in 1974.

Track listing
 "I Can't Stand the Rain" (Don Bryant, Bernard "Bernie" Miller, Ann Peebles) – 2:31
 "Do I Need You" (Bryant, Peebles) – 2:33
 "Until You Came Into My Life" (Bryant, Miller, Peebles) – 3:13
 "(You Keep Me) Hanging On" (Ira Allen, Buddy Mize) – 2:44
 "Run Run Run" (Bryant, Darryl Carter, Peebles) – 2:38
 "If We Can't Trust Each Other" (Earl Randle) – 2:55
 "A Love Vibration" (Bryant, Miller, Peebles) – 2:50
 "You Got to Feed the Fire" (Bryant, Miller, Peebles) – 2:22
 "I'm Gonna Tear Your Playhouse Down" (Earl Randle) – 2:45
 "One Way Street" (Bryant, Peebles) – 2:50

Personnel
Ann Peebles – vocals
Howard Grimes – drums
Jack Hale – trombone
Charles Hodges – Hammond organ
Leroy Hodges – bass guitar
Mabon "Teenie" Hodges – guitar
Wayne Jackson – trumpet
Ed Logan – tenor saxophone
Andrew Love – tenor saxophone
James Mitchell – baritone saxophone
Archie Turner – piano
Rhode – background vocals
Memphis Sanctified Singers – horn section
Sandra Chalmers – background vocals

References

1974 albums
Hi Records albums
Albums produced by Willie Mitchell (musician)
Ann Peebles albums